Sugar Puff (1951 - 25 May 2007) was the oldest living pony at age 56 until his death in May 2007.

References

1951 animal births
2007 animal deaths
Ponies